Nationwide Mutual Insurance Company and affiliated companies, commonly shortened to Nationwide, is a group of large U.S. insurance and financial services companies based in Columbus, Ohio. The company also operates regional headquarters in Scottsdale, Arizona; Des Moines, Iowa and San Antonio, Texas. Nationwide currently has approximately 25,000 employees, and is ranked No. 80 in the 2022 Fortune 500 list. Nationwide is currently ranked No. 21 in Fortune's "100 Best Companies to Work For".

Nationwide Financial Services (NFS), a component of the group, was partially floated on the New York Stock Exchange prior to being repurchased by Nationwide Mutual in 2009. It had owned the majority of NFS common stock since it had gone public in 1997.

History

Beginnings as Farm Bureau Mutual
In the 1920s, farmers were paying the same rates on their automobile insurance as city drivers even though they had fewer accidents and claims than city drivers. The Ohio Farm Bureau decided to set up its own insurance company to offer rates that accurately reflected the driving habits of farmers. On April 10, 1926, the Farm Bureau Mutual Automobile Insurance Company obtained a license to do business in Ohio, and two days later, it acquired its financing—a $10,000 loan drawn from the membership dues of the Ohio Farm Bureau Federation.

At that time, Ohio law required 100 people to pledge to become policyholders. The first agents managed to recruit ten times that number, and on April 14, 1926, Farm Bureau Mutual started a business with over 1,000 policyholders. The first product of the new company, as its name implied, was automobile insurance. The company wrote policies only to Ohio farmers who were members for the Ohio Farm Bureau.

Expansion
In 1928, Farm Bureau Mutual expanded to West Virginia, followed by Maryland, Delaware, Vermont, and North Carolina. Farm Bureau Mutual began underwriting residents of small towns in 1931 and residents in larger cities in 1934. Also, in 1934, Farm Bureau Mutual began offering fire insurance. This product grew the following year with the purchase of a struggling fire insurance company.

In 1935, Farm Bureau Mutual acquired the Life Insurance Company of America from the bankrupt fraternal insurer, American Insurance Union. The company was later renamed to Farm Bureau Life Insurance Company in 1938.

With growth, came a need for the expansion of office space. In 1936, the company moved into the 246 Building at 246 N. High Street in Columbus.

By 1943, Farm Bureau Mutual operated in 12 states and the District of Columbia. Even with the tripling of space in the 246 Building (which was finally dedicated on the 25th anniversary of the company), Farm Bureau Mutual still had insufficient office space and began opening regional offices in 1951.

In 1955, Farm Bureau Mutual changed its name to Nationwide Insurance, a name by which it is commonly known today. In the 10 years that followed, Nationwide expanded into Oregon, making the company truly "nationwide". It also expanded into 19 other states, bringing the total by 1965 to 32 states and the District of Columbia.

Nationwide outgrew the 246 Building by the 1970s, and work began on a new skyscraper headquarters for the company. In 1978, One Nationwide Plaza was completed at the southwest corner of N. High Street and Nationwide Blvd. on the northern edge of downtown Columbus, Ohio. Since 1988, Nationwide has added the following to its presence in Downtown Columbus: Plaza Two (on the northeast corner of High Street and Chestnut), Plaza Three (just west of High Street and Chestnut), Plaza Four (Front Street), 275 Marconi (behind Plazas One and Three on Marconi Blvd), and 10 West Nationwide, which together with Plaza One form the primary downtown complex. In addition to downtown Columbus, Nationwide also has a significant presence in the Columbus, Ohio metropolitan suburbs of Dublin, Grandview Heights, and Grove City.

Nationwide Slogan & Jingle 
The genesis for the Nationwide slogan, "The Man from Nationwide is on your Side" was first introduced to the public in 1965, composed by Steve Karmen, an acclaimed jingle writer and it was later set to music in 1969. But by 1971 being an insurance agent was no longer strictly a male profession, so the words "the Man from" were dropped in 1972, and "Nationwide is on your side" became the slogan, after the first female agent Diana M Krapf was hired and asked that it be changed so she could properly represent the company as an insurance agent. Nationwide did make these changes (i.e. signs, letterheads, TV and print ads, even business cards) showing the changing attitudes of the times and were followed years later by other major companies.

Nationwide Jingle Singers & Performers
 Jana Kramer
 Peyton Manning
 Leslie Odom Jr.
 Brad Paisley
 Rachel Platten
 Julia Roberts
 Jill Scott (singer)
 H.E.R.

Sponsorships

Nationwide Tour
In 2003, Nationwide secured the naming rights from what was then the Buy.com Tour, the second-highest men's professional golf tour in the United States. The tour was known by this name until 2012 when Nationwide relinquished the naming rights.

Nationwide Children's Hospital
On September 24, 2007, Columbus Children's Hospital was rededicated as Nationwide Children's Hospital. This was done in response to a $50 million donation to the hospital by Nationwide.

Helping Columbus become a major league city

By 1997, the city of Columbus had grown to become the 15th largest city in the United States. However, Columbus by this time was the largest American city without a professional sports franchise competing in the top leagues in the United States (i.e., Major League Baseball, the National Football League, the National Basketball Association, or the National Hockey League).

After plans to move the Hartford Whalers to Columbus failed when voters rejected a tax levy, the Nationwide Mutual Insurance Company announced that it would build an arena adjacent to One Nationwide Plaza in an effort to bring an NHL franchise to Columbus. This second effort was successful, and the Columbus Blue Jackets began play to at Nationwide Arena in late 2000. Nationwide Arena, named for the company, is the centerpiece of the Arena District, an area of entertainment venues, restaurants, and hotels linking downtown Columbus with The Short North neighborhood.

Nationwide Realty Investors is the company's real estate development arm and was involved with providing the land for a new soccer stadium in Columbus. Nationwide sponsors the Major League Soccer club Columbus Crew, the other major-league sports franchise in town, and has appeared on the front of team shirts since 2020.

NASCAR

Nationwide became the title sponsor of the NASCAR Nationwide Series beginning in the 2008 season. On September 18, 2013, the company announced it will no longer sponsor the series after 2014 but will remain an official sponsor of NASCAR. Beginning in 2015, Nationwide became the primary sponsor for Dale Earnhardt Jr. in the Sprint Cup Series.

Memorial Tournament
On September 3, 2010, Nationwide announced a six-year deal to become the presenting sponsor of the PGA Tour Memorial Tournament beginning with the 2010 event.

Jack Hanna
In March 2010, Nationwide announced it would be co-sponsoring Columbus Zoo and Aquarium Director Emeritus Jack Hanna's Into the Wild TV show and national speaking tour.

The companies
Nationwide is one of the largest insurance and financial services companies in the world, focusing on domestic property and casualty insurance, life insurance and retirement savings, asset management, and strategic investments.

The Nationwide family includes:

Property and Casualty

• ALLIED Insurance Company of America

• ALLIED Property and Casualty Insurance Company

• AMCO Insurance Company

• Colonial County Mutual Insurance Company

• Crestbrook Insurance Company

• Depositors Insurance Company

• Freedom Specialty Insurance Company

• Harleysville Insurance Company

• Harleysville Insurance Company of New Jersey

• Harleysville Insurance Company of New York

• Harleysville Lake States Insurance Company

• Harleysville Preferred Insurance Company

• Harleysville Worcester Insurance Company

• Nationwide Affinity Insurance Company of America

• Nationwide Agribusiness Insurance Company

• Nationwide Assurance Company

• Nationwide General Insurance Company

• Nationwide Indemnity Company

• Nationwide Insurance Company of America

• Nationwide Insurance Company of Florida

• Nationwide Lloyds

• Nationwide Mutual Insurance Company

• Nationwide Property and Casualty Insurance Company

• National Casualty Company

• Scottsdale Indemnity Company

• Scottsdale Insurance Company

• Scottsdale Surplus Lines Insurance Company

• Titan Insurance Company

• Veterinary Pet Insurance Company

• Victoria Fire & Casualty Company

• Victoria Select Insurance Company

Life Insurance, Retirement, and Investments

• Eagle Captive Reinsurance, LCC

• Jefferson National Life Insurance Company

• Jefferson National Life Insurance Company of New York

• Jefferson National Securities Corporation

• Nationwide Asset Management, LLC

• Nationwide Trust Company, FSB

• Nationwide Financial Assignment Company

• Nationwide Financial General Agency, Inc.

• Nationwide Financial Services Capital Trust

• Nationwide Financial Services, Inc.

• Nationwide Fund Advisors

• Nationwide Fund Distributors LLC

• Nationwide Fund Management LLC

• Nationwide Investment Advisors, LLC

• Nationwide Investment Services Corporation

• Nationwide Life and Annuity Insurance Company

• Nationwide Life Insurance Company

• Nationwide Realty Investors, Ltd.

• Nationwide Retirement Solutions, Inc.

• Nationwide SBL, LLC

• Nationwide Securities, LLC

• NFS Distributors, Inc.

• NNOV8, LLC

• Olentangy Reinsurance, LLC

• Registered Investment Advisors Services, Inc.

Previously Owned Companies
 Nationwide Communications, a broadcasting company that owned radio station WNCI

Diversity
Since 2004, Nationwide has continuously received a 100% rating each year on the Corporate Equality Index, which is released by the gay rights activist group Human Rights Campaign. Nationwide includes "sexual orientation" and "gender identity" in its equal employment opportunity policy, and provides diversity training to its employees on sexual orientation.

In 2008, Nationwide entered into an exclusive partnership with Tavis Smiley, including sponsorship of Smiley's PBS television program as a provider of property and casualty insurance products. The sponsorship of the television program ended in 2011, but the partnership continues for other events and initiatives.

Nationwide was also a national sponsor of the 2009 State of the Black Union event.

Nationwide hired Vernon Blatz, one of the country's first blind computer programmers, in 1964. He attended the University of Cincinnati Medical Center's trial run of the nation's first training program to educate the blind about careers involving computers.

Technology

Enterprise Collaboration
Nationwide's internal collaboration platform "SPOT" is an advanced enterprise social media platform that combines Yammer and SharePoint to provide a unified experience to Nationwide employees.

Mobile claims application
In 2009, Nationwide released Nationwide Mobile, a free iPhone application for Nationwide auto insurance customers and other iPhone users. The app is designed to assist drivers with the steps to take after an accident. It also helps Nationwide customers start the claims process, finds Nationwide-certified local repair shops, and facilitates the exchange of accident and insurance information. Nationwide was the first US insurer to offer such an application for the iPhone.

CEOs

Controversies

Death benefit controversy
In October 2012, Nationwide agreed to pay $7.2 million to resolve a market conduct exam by a multistate task force regarding its use of the Social Security Death Master File database for paying life insurance claims. Life insurance policies make it clear that it is up to the beneficiaries to notify the insurer. Most insured do notify their insurance companies but as a result of this exam Nationwide identified $144 million in benefits that had not been paid because of customers' failure to file a claims report. The agreement was announced by California Insurance Commissioner Dave Jones on behalf of California, Florida, Illinois, New Hampshire, North Dakota, Pennsylvania, and Ohio. The pact reached with the task force will commit Nationwide and other insurers to compare its records against the Social Security Death Index and conduct a search for beneficiaries.

Claims of bad faith
In June 2014, Nationwide was hit with an $18 million punitive damages award after a plaintiff proved the company "strong-armed its policyholder rather than negotiating in good faith to compensate the plaintiff for the loss suffered in an automobile collision."

Super Bowl ad
During the second quarter of Super Bowl XLIX, Nationwide aired a controversial commercial to promote its Make Safe Happen child safety website and initiative, in which a deceased boy reflects on what life milestones he could not partake in due to his premature death in an accident.  The advertisement was scorned and ridiculed by many as morbid, disturbing, and in poor taste against the backdrop of a major, upbeat professional sports event.  Following its negative reception, Nationwide released a statement defending its decision to air the ad, explaining that child safety is a serious issue that must be addressed.

See also
 List of United States insurance companies

References

External links
 
 Nationwide Financial website
 Nationwide Pet Insurance website
1971 TV ad saying "the man from Nationwide is on your side"

American companies established in 1926
Titan Insurance Company
Companies based in the Columbus, Ohio metropolitan area
Financial services companies established in 1926
Titan Insurance Company
Mutual insurance companies of the United States